Generator set may refer to:
 Diesel generator
 Engine-generator
 Generating set (mathematics)